Katarzyna Tubylewicz (born 26 August 1974 in Warsaw) is a Polish writer, translator, and a journalist based in Stockholm, Sweden.

Career
Tubylewicz graduated from the University of Warsaw's faculty of American Studies with a Masters in Cultural Studies, and has studied Polish Studies at University of Warsaw, Swedish Studies at the University of Stockholm and Literary Translation at Södertörns högskola. Between 2006 and 2012, she was the director of the Polish Institute in Stockholm and the cultural attaché at the Polish Embassy in Sweden. She has taught Polish Studies at the University of Stockholm and translation studies at the University of Uppsala. In 2013, she was the programme director of the first edition of the Gdańsk Meetings of Literary Translators Found in Translation / Odnalezione w Tłumaczeniu.

Tubylewicz has written numerous essays and novels, and is the translator of several books from Swedish into Polish. As a journalist, she regularly contributes to Gazeta Wyborcza, TokFm Radio and Krytyka Polityczna.

Personal life
Tubylewicz is married and has one son. She is also a professional yoga teacher. She lives in Stockholm.

Works
Journalism, nonfiction

 Stockholm. A Capital City Humming With Silence, Wielka Litera 2019 
 Moralists. How Swedes Learn From Mistakes and Other Stories, Wielka Litera, 2017
 Sweden Reads. Poland Reads(co-author Agata Diduszko-Zyglewska) Wydawnictwo Krytyki Politycznej, 2015
 I Am a Mum, Wydawnictwo Znak, 2004 (antologin av texter, urval och ed. Katarzyna Tubylewicz) 
 A Swedish Sort of Solitude? Of the people of the North who enjoy being alone, Wielka Litera, February 2021

Novels
A Very Cold Spring, Wydawnictwo WAB, 2020 
Marcel And His Last Novel, Wielka Litera, 2016 
The Last Of Friends, Wydawnictwo, WAB, 2013 
Personal Places, Jacek Santorski, 2005

Translations

Majgull Axelsson, Dom Augusty (Slumpvandring), Wydawnictwo WAB, 2006
Majgull Axelsson, Ta, którą nigdy nie byłam (Den jag aldrig var) Wydawnictwo WAB, 2008 
Maciej Zaremba, Polski hydraulik i inne opowieści ze Szwecji (Polsk rörmokare), Wydawnictwo Czarne 2008 (co-translators: Wojciech Chudoba, Jan Rost, Anna Topczewska) 
Majgull Axelsson, Lód i woda, woda i lód (Is och vatten, vatten och is) Wydawnictwo WAB, 2010 
Majgull Axelsson, Pępowina (Moderspassion), Wydawnictwo WAB, 2011 
Jonas Gardell, Nigdy nie ocieraj łez bez rękawiczek (Tårka aldrig tårar utan handskar), Wydawnictwo WAB, 2012 
Niklas Orrenius, Strzały w Kopenhadze (sv. Skotten i Köpenhamn), Wydawnictwo Poznańskie 2018 
Kjell Westö, Niebo o barwie siarki (sv. Den svavelgula himlen) Wydawnictwo Poznańskie, 2021

Awards and Prizes

 Golden Polonia Owl Prize for helping promote Polish culture abroad (2018) 
 Shorlited for The Ryszard Kapuściński Prize in the Translator Prize Category (2019) for her translation of Shootings in Copenhagen by Niklas Orrenius.
 Moralists. How Swedes Learn From Mistakes and Other Stories'' was included on the list of the top five pieces of journalism to be published in Poland in 2017 by the editors of Tygodnik Powszechny

References

External links
 Tubylewicz's entry at Barbara Zitwer Literary Agency
 Books of Katarzyna Tubylewicz at Goodreads

1974 births
20th-century Polish novelists
21st-century Polish novelists
People from Warsaw
Living people
Cultural attachés